Carl Emil Doepler (1824–1905) was a German painter, illustrator and costume designer. He created the costumes for Richard Wagner's opera Der Ring des Nibelungen at the Bayreuther Festspiele in 1876. These costumes included horned helmets, and are widely credited with starting the popular myth that Viking warriors wore horned helmets, even though there is no direct archaeological evidence to support this.

His son, Emil Doepler, was also an artist.

See also
 List of German painters

Notes

References 

 Simek, Rudolf (2007) translated by Angela Hall. Dictionary of Northern Mythology. D.S. Brewer

External links
 Illustrations for Nordisch-Germanische Götter und Helden by Wilhelm Wägner and Jakob Nover, 1882.
Selected Costume Designs for the premiere performance of Richard Wagner's Der Ring des Nibelingen



1824 births
1905 deaths
19th-century German painters
German male painters
20th-century German painters
20th-century German male artists
German costume designers
German illustrators
19th-century German male artists